Calliostoma katherina is a species of sea snail, a marine gastropod mollusk in the family Calliostomatidae, the calliostoma top snails.

Some authors place this taxon in the subgenus Calliostoma (Benthastelena).

Description
The height of the shell attains 14 mm.

Distribution
This marine species occurs off Queensland and New South Wales, Australia.

References

 Iredale, T. & McMichael, D.F. (1962). A reference list of the marine Mollusca of New South Wales. Memoirs of the Australian Museum. 11 : 1-109
 Wilson, B. (1993). Australian Marine Shells. Prosobranch Gastropods. Kallaroo, WA : Odyssey Publishing. Vol.1 1st Edn pp. 1–408

External links
 

katherina
Gastropods described in 1936